The Jewish poll tax was a poll tax imposed on the Jews in Polish–Lithuanian Commonwealth. It was later absorbed into the hiberna tax. 

The Jews were exempt from other state and municipal taxes, which often caused protests from Polish city dwellers.

Initially the collection of the tax was a duty of Jewish Councils (Council of Four Lands, Council of the Land of Lithuania). Sometimes it was paid to the royal treasury, other times it was paid directly to the military units funded from this tax.

The Jewish councils divide the tax into smaller internal divisions called "portions" (Hebrew: skhumot, Polish: sympla). The sum of the portions was always larger than the state-imposed amount, and the council used the surplus for the needs of Jewish community and the council apparatus. This practice was common for non-Jewish taxes as well,  and the Crown was aware of it.

By early 17th century the duty of Jewish poll tax was transferred to sejmiks, later to Polish military, and by mid-17th century it was absorbed into the hiberna.

See also
Taxation of the Jews in Europe for other types of taxes imposed on the Jews

References

Polish–Lithuanian Commonwealth
Legal history of Poland
Abolished taxes
Taxation of foreigners
Poll taxes
History of taxation
[Category:Disabilities (Jewish) in Europe]]
Jewish Polish history
Jewish Lithuanian history